Suryagadhi is a Rural municipality located within the Nuwakot District of the Bagmati Province of Nepal.
The municipality spans  of area, with a total population of 16,800 according to a 2011 Nepal census.

On March 10, 2017, the Government of Nepal restructured the local level bodies into 753 new local level structures.
The previous Lachyang, Bageshwari Chokadi, Kalikahalde and Ganeshthan VDCs were merged to form Suryagadhi Rural Municipality.
Suryagadhi is divided into 5 wards, with Bageshwari Chokadi declared the administrative center of the rural municipality.

References

External links
official website of the rural municipality

Rural municipalities in Nuwakot District
Rural municipalities of Nepal established in 2017